María Sánchez Lorenzo was the defending champion, but did not compete this year.

Anna Smashnova won the title by defeating Dominique Van Roost 6–2, 7–5 in the final.

Seeds
The first two seeds received a bye into the second round.

Draw

Finals

Top half

Bottom half

References

External links
 Official results archive (ITF)
 Official results archive (WTA)

WTA Knokke-Heist
2000 WTA Tour